Sopra may refer to:
Sopra Steria, a consulting, IT services and software development company.
Sopra, Bhopalgarh, a village in India.